Albrecht Theodor Emil Graf von Roon (30 April 180323 February 1879) was a Prussian soldier and statesman. As Minister of  War from 1859 to 1873, Roon, along with Otto von Bismarck and Helmuth von Moltke, was a dominating figure in Prussia's government during the key decade of the 1860s, when a series of successful wars against Denmark, Austria, and France led to German unification under Prussia's leadership.  A moderate conservative and supporter of executive monarchy, he was an avid modernizer who worked to improve the efficiency of the army.

Education 
Roon was born at Pleushagen (now Pleśna), near Kolberg (now Kołobrzeg, Poland). His family was of Flemish origin and had settled in Pomerania. His father, an officer of the Prussian Army, died in poverty during the French occupation of the Kingdom of Prussia (see Napoleonic Wars), and the young Roon was brought up by his maternal grandmother.

Roon entered the corps of cadets at Kulm (now Chełmno, Poland) in 1816, from where he proceeded to the military school at Berlin in 1818, and in January 1821, he received a commission in the 14th (3rd Pomeranian) regiment quartered at Stargard in Pomerania. In 1824, he went through the three-year higher course of study at the General War School in Berlin (later called the Prussian Military Academy), where he improved his general education. Two years later, he was transferred to the 15th regiment at Minden.

Publications 
In 1826, he was appointed an instructor in the military cadet school at Berlin, where he devoted himself especially to the subject of military geography. He was a student of the noted geographer Carl Ritter who taught at the Berlin military school. In 1832, Roon published the well-known Principles of Physical, National and Political Geography, in three volumes (Grundlage der Erd-, Völker- und Staaten-Kunde), which gained him a great reputation, and of which over 40,000 copies were sold in a few years. This work was followed in 1834 by Elements of Geography (Anfangsgrunde der Erdkunde), in 1837 by Military Geography of Europe (Militärische Landerbeschreibung von Europa), and in 1839 by The Iberian Peninsula (Die Iberische Halbinsel).

Early military career 
In 1832, Roon rejoined his regiment and was afterwards attached to the headquarters of General von Müffling's corps of observation at Krefeld, where he first became aware of the very inefficient state of the Prussian Army. In 1833, he was appointed to the Topographical Bureau at Berlin. In 1835, he entered the Prussian General Staff, and, in 1835, he was promoted captain and became instructor and examiner in the military academy at Berlin. In 1842, after an illness of two years brought on by overwork, he was promoted to major and attached to the staff of the VII Corps, where he was again impressed with the inefficiency of the organization of the army, and he occupied himself with schemes for its reform.

In 1844, as tutor to Prince Friedrich Karl of Prussia, he attended the prince at Bonn University and in his European travels. In 1848, he was appointed chief of the staff of the VIII Corps at Koblenz. During the disturbances of that year, he served under Prince William, later king and emperor, in the suppression of the insurrection at Baden and distinguished himself by his energy and bravery, receiving the 3rd class of the order of the Red Eagle in recognition of his services. While attached to the prince's staff at that time, he broached to him the subject of his schemes of army reform. In 1850, after the revelation of defective organization and efficiency that led to the humiliating Treaty of Olmütz, Roon was made a lieutenant-colonel and, in 1851, full colonel.

Army reform 
Promoted to major-general in 1856 and to lieutenant-general in 1859, Roon had held several commands since 1850, having been employed on important missions. Prince Wilhelm became regent in 1858 and, in 1859, appointed Roon a member of a commission to report on the reorganization of the army. During the Austro-Sardinian War, Roon was charged with the mobilization of a division. At the end of 1859, although he was only a junior lieutenant-general in the army, he succeeded Eduard von Bonin as war minister. In 1861, the ministry of marine was also entrusted to him.

Supported by Edwin von Manteuffel and the new Prussian Chief of Staff, Helmuth von Moltke, Roon drew up plans to adapt Gerhard von Scharnhorst's system to Prussia's altered circumstances. Roon proposed an increase in universal military service to three years, with new regiments raised and a reduced role for the reserve (Landwehr), whose role in the War of Liberation (1813) was still celebrated in nationalist myth.

Roon, by contrast, believed that the Landwehr was both a politically and militarily false institution, limited in utility and lacking martial qualities. Roon's proposals for army reorganization met with strong opposition from the Prussian Landtag, which was dominated by the liberal German Progress Party, which wanted parliamentary control over the military budget. It took years of political fighting and the strong support of the new prime minister, Otto von Bismarck and Moltke, before Roon carried the day.

Roon also lengthened the compulsory military service to three years (four years for artillery and cavalry), and expanded the army to 200,000 men. These reforms were unpopular with the Prussian people and made Roon one of the most hated men in Prussia. However the reforms were supported by the King William I, and the chancellor Otto von Bismarck.

National hero 

After the successful outcome of the Second Schleswig War of 1864, Roon went from being widely disliked in Prussia to a national hero in still-disunited Germany.

At the start of the Austro-Prussian War, Roon was promoted to General der Infanterie. He was present at the decisive victory at Königgrätz, under the command of Moltke. He received the Black Eagle at Nikolsburg on the road to Vienna. His army system was adopted after 1866 by the whole North German Confederation. In later years, his army system was copied throughout continental Europe.

During the Franco-Prussian War in 1870–1871, Roon was in attendance on Prussian King Wilhelm I. The war was a great victory for Prussia and Roon's contribution to success was considerable. He was created a Graf (count) on 19 January 1871, just after Moltke. In January 1873, he succeeded Bismarck (who continued to be Imperial Chancellor) as Minister President of Prussia. Ill-health compelled him to resign later that year, handing the job back to Bismarck. Roon was promoted to field marshal on 1 January 1873. However he resigned from the army soon due to ill health.

Roon died in Berlin on 23 February 1879. He was interred in the Roon family crypt at Schloss Krobnitz, west of Görlitz.

Memorials
The armored cruiser SMS Roon, completed in 1906, was named for Albrecht von Roon.

Honours and awards
He received the following orders and decorations:

Bibliography
His son published Denkwürdigkeiten aus dem Leben des Generalfeldmarschalls Kriegsministers Grafen Roon (Memorable experiences from the life of General Field Marshal and Minister of War Count Roon) (2 vols., Breslau, 1892), and Kriegsminister von Roon als Redner politisch und militärisch erläutert (Minister of War Roon's Political and Military Speeches Examined) (Breslau, 1895). His correspondence with his friend Professor Cl. Perthes, 1864–67, was also published at Breslau in 1895.

References

External links

1803 births
1879 deaths
People from Koszalin County
Field marshals of the German Empire
Field marshals of Prussia
Independent politicians in Germany
Members of the Prussian House of Lords
Members of the Prussian House of Representatives
Prime Ministers of Prussia
German monarchists
Counts of Germany
Prussian military personnel of the Second Schleswig War
Prussian people of the Austro-Prussian War
German military personnel of the Franco-Prussian War
German people of Flemish descent
People from the Province of Pomerania
Recipients of the Pour le Mérite (military class)
Recipients of the Iron Cross (1870), 1st class
Grand Crosses of the Military Merit Order (Bavaria)
Recipients of the Military Merit Cross (Mecklenburg-Schwerin)
Grand Crosses of the Order of Saint Stephen of Hungary
Grand Croix of the Légion d'honneur
Recipients of the Order of St. George of the Third Degree
Recipients of the Order of St. Vladimir, 1st class